Jonas Jonsson (born 10 November 1975) is a Swedish former professional footballer who played as a midfielder.

Career
Jonsson joined Bryne FK from Assyriska FF ahead of the 2000 Norwegian Premier League season. He played in the 2001 Norwegian Football Cup Final. Ahead of the 2002 season he joined SK Brann. He struggled with a serious injury, and was released after his contract expired in late 2003. He did not play in 2004, but joined Stord Sunnhordland FK ahead of the 2005 Norwegian Second Division season.

In the summer of 2005 the club stopped paying wages to six or seven players with contracts, and compensations to the rest of the players. When the head coach, Vegard Hansen, resigned because the club could not longer pay his wages, Jonsson became acting head coach. However, he was not paid at all for coaching the team, and left for Mandalskameratene. He was playing assistant coach. Despite this he went on loan to Stord in the latter half of 2006. After the season Jonsson revealed that there had been cooperation problems with head coach Svein Hansen. He retired from football. In December 2006 he won a Supreme Court of Norway case, and was entitled to compensation for his injury sustained in 2001.

References

External links
 

1975 births
Living people
Association football midfielders
Swedish footballers
Assyriska FF players
Bryne FK players
SK Brann players
Eliteserien players
Swedish expatriate footballers
Expatriate footballers in Norway
Swedish expatriate sportspeople in Norway
Swedish football managers
Footballers from Stockholm